The Valamara is a mountain of the Central Mountain Range in Southeastern Albania.

Geography 
The mountain is roughly part of a series of mountains, extending from north-northeast to south-southwest between the valleys of Shkumbin in the north and Devoll in the south. It is one of the highest peaks in the European continent, in terms of topographic prominence.

There is a rich evidence of previous glaciation in the highest parts of the mountains as glaciers covered the mountains and created its cirque-shaped lakes and depressions. There are at least eight glacial lakes across the mountain range. The eastern edge of the mountain gives rise to several rivers amongst them the third longest river of the country, the Shkumbin. The western and southern edges of the mountain are drained by Devoll, which has formed a deep gorge between the mountains.

Near the main ridge of Valamara there are very few trees while Valamara's lower slopes are forested. To the south there are many glacial lakes which are tourist attractions. Brown bears have been observed in the mountain region.

Nearby towns and villages
Lenie
Pogradec
Strelcë
Grabovë e Poshtme
Grabovë e Sipërme (Grabova)
Bicaj

Some peaks on Valamara Mountain
 Maja e Valamarës  (2373 m)
 Maja e Gurit të Topit  (2120 m)   
 Mali i Lenies  (2012 m)

See also 
 Mountains of Albania
 Geology of Albania
 Geography of Albania

References 

Mountains of Europe
Mountains of Albania
Geography of Korçë County
Geography of Elbasan County